Ken Hom (born May 3, 1949) is a Chinese-American chef, author and television-show presenter for the BBC, specialising in Asian Cuisine. Having already appointed an honorary Officer of the Order of the British Empire (OBE) in 2009 for "services to culinary arts", he was further appointed an honorary Commander of the Order of the British Empire (CBE) in 2022.

Early life 

Hom was born in Tucson, Arizona, to Taishanese parents. He was raised in Chicago, Illinois, by his widowed mother, Ying Fong, after his father died when Hom was eight months old. Hom first learned cooking at the age of eleven when he worked in his uncle's Chinese restaurant. He went to California to study History of Art at the University of California, Berkeley.

During this time he taught Italian cooking lessons at weekends to supplement his college fees. This led him on to teach Chinese cookery classes. In 1977 he was invited to join San Francisco's new California Culinary Academy as an instructor.

TV career 
In 1982, after a 2-year global search, the BBC auditioned him for a Chinese cookery series. The resulting TV series, Ken Hom's Chinese Cookery, had a companion book published by BBC Books.

He has since appeared in a number of prime time BBC TV series. His series for KBS called Noodle Road is a five-hour documentary on the history of the noodle. It sold in 23 countries and won the Peabody award in 2009. In 2012 he co-presented the BBC series Exploring China: A Culinary Adventure with Ching He Huang. He has made some of his many appearances on the BBC's long-running weekly show Saturday Kitchen with Huang.

Charity 

Since 2008, Hom has been an ambassador for Action Against Hunger, a humanitarian charity which works in over 40 countries helping families to feed their children and build a sustainable life.  In 2010, he was diagnosed with prostate cancer and had proton radiation therapy in Japan. The cancer was successfully treated and he is now an ambassador for Prostate Cancer UK (formerly known as The Prostate Cancer Charity), building awareness for the early detection and treatment of cancers.

Awards and honours

 Inducted in the Who's Who of Food and Beverage in America as recognition of significant and lasting achievement in the culinary industry, 1990
 Honorary Chairperson of The Institute for the Advancement of the Science & Art of Chinese Cuisine, 1993
 Honorary Member of the 48 Group Club, 2002
 Appointed Founding Patron of Oxford Gastronomica: the Centre for Food, Drink and Culture, 2007
 Honorary doctorate from Oxford Brookes University for outstanding success within the international food world, 2007
 Grand Prize Winner Documentary - ABU Awards, 2009
 Grand Prize Winner - Korea's Producer Award for "Noodle Road", 2009
Appointed Founding Patron of the Oxford Cultural Collective, 2017
 Awarded Honorary Officer of the Order of the British Empire OBE by Queen Elizabeth II for services to the culinary arts, 2009
 "Noodle Road" nominated for best TV documentary of New York Film Festival, 2010
 Honorary Member of the Cherie Blair Foundation for Women, 2010
 Peabody Award for "Noodle Road" TV documentary series for KBS, 2010
 Food Broadcast of the Year Award 2013 for "Exploring China: A Culinary Adventure" with Ching He Huang Guild of Food Writers Awards
 Awarded Honorary Commander of the Order of the British Empire CBE by Queen Elizabeth II for services to charity, culinary arts and education, 2022

In Ken Hom's name:

 Annual Ken Hom Lecture series at Oxford Brookes University
 Ken Hom Writer in Residence Fellowship at Oxford Brookes University
 The Ken Hom Collection at the Oxford Brookes University		

Book awards:

 "Ken Hom’s East Meets West Cuisine" (Macmillan, 1987) Shortlisted for Andre Simon Memorial Book of Year
 "Easy Family Dishes: A Memoir with Recipes" (BBC Books, 1998) Winner of the Andre Simon Memorial Book of Year
 "The Taste of China" (Pavilion Books, 1990) Shortlisted for Andre Simon Memorial Book of Year
 "Ken Hom’s Quick Wok" (Headline Books, 2001) Cookbook of the Year from Food and  Wine magazine, USA
 "Truffes" with Pierre-Jean Pébeyre  (Hachette, 2001) Shortlisted for Prix Litteraire de la Gastronomie Antonin Careme
 "Exploring China: A Culinary Adventure" (with Ching He Huang) (2012) Gourmand International Awards 2013,  Paris Cookbook Fair – ‘Best in the World’ award for the Culinary Travel Category. Short listed for The Guild of Food Writers Awards 2013 for both the Food Broadcast of the Year Award and the Award for Work on Food and Travel
 "Truffles with Pierre-Jean Pébeyre (Serindia 2014) Winner Gourmand World Cookbook Award 2015 for Best Mushrooms (USA)
 The Best25 (25 years of cookbooks) The Gourmand Awards: Exploring China: A Culinary Adventure By Ken Hom & Ching He Huang 2021 in at Paris Cookbook Fair

Business interests 

Since 1986 Hom has had a base in Paris. In 1997 he settled permanently in south west France in a restored 13th century tower in Lot. Hom has also spent more time in his adopted home of Thailand since 2003.

Hom is an author of more than 20 cookery books. Alongside his best known work on Chinese cuisine, his works also include topics on Cambodian, Malaysian, Thai, Singaporean, and Vietnamese cooking. He has worked as a consultant for hotels and restaurants and cooked personally for presidents, celebrities and royalty.

In 2009, Hom entered into an exclusive agreement with British supermarket chain Tesco to launch a 32-product range of Ken Hom branded Chinese ready meals.

Despite semi-retirement, he continues to travel extensively worldwide and divides his time between France and Bangkok.

Television 

 Ken Hom’s Chinese Cookery (1984)
 Hot Chefs (1992)
 Ken Hom’s Hot Wok (1996)
 Ken Hom’s Travels with a Hot Wok (1998)
 Foolproof Chinese Cookery (2000)
 Take on the Takeaway (2007)
 Noodle Road (KBS) (2008)
 Exploring China: A Culinary Adventure (with Ching He Huang) (2012)

Books

References

General references

External links 

 
 Ken Hom on the My Kitchen Table website
 Ken Hom's Library at Oxford Brookes University contains all the books that he used throughout his career, with an emphasis on Asian cookery, including Chinese, Korean, Thai and Japanese, as well as memorabilia to do with his television shows and consulting work, including menus, invitations, photographs and artifacts.

1949 births
American chefs
American male chefs
Living people
American people of Chinese descent
Writers from Tucson, Arizona
Writers from Chicago
University of California, Berkeley alumni
Honorary Commanders of the Order of the British Empire
Asian American chefs
Chefs from Berkeley, California